Yosef Rosenthal (14 February 1844 – 22 November 1913) was a Polish-Jewish Hebrew writer and lawyer.

Biography
Born in Suwałki, Russian Poland, Rosenthal began the study of the Talmud and commentaries at an early age without the aid of a teacher, and at the same time devoted himself to the study of different languages and sciences. In the 1890s he settled at Warsaw to practise law.

Rosenthal began his literary career in 1866 by contributing philological articles to Ha-Maggid. He wrote also some responsa, one of which was published in Dibre Mosheh by Rabbi Moses of Namoset; and Derekh Emunah, four essays on religious philosophy (Warsaw, 1894).

He was noted as a chess player, and won the first prize at the Druzgenik tournament in 1885.

References
 

1844 births
1913 deaths
19th-century chess players
19th-century Polish lawyers
19th-century Polish male writers
Hebrew-language writers
Jewish Polish writers
People from Suwałki
Philosophers of Judaism